Odis McKinney, Jr. (born May 19, 1957) is a former American football cornerback in the National Football League (NFL) for the New York Giants the Oakland/Los Angeles Raiders, and the Kansas City Chiefs.  He played High School football at Reseda High in Los Angeles and college football at Los Angeles Valley College in the San Fernando Valley and the University of Colorado and was drafted in the second round of the 1978 NFL Draft.

1957 births
Players of American football from Los Angeles
Players of American football from Detroit
American football cornerbacks
Colorado Buffaloes football players
Living people
Los Angeles Raiders players
New York Giants players
Oakland Raiders players
Kansas City Chiefs players
African-American players of American football
Los Angeles Valley Monarchs football players
21st-century African-American people
20th-century African-American sportspeople